Vladimir Jovović (born 26 October 1994) is a Montenegrin professional footballer who plays as an attacking midfielder for Czech team Jablonec.

Club career

Sutjeska
Jovović made his professional debut with Sutjeska Nikšić in 2011 at the age of 17. He was one of the youngest starting players in Sutjeska's championship-winning generation of the 2012-13 season. In the 2013-14 UEFA Champions League qualifying phase, he recorded an assist in the match against Sheriff Tiraspol in Tiraspol. In June 2013, Partizan sent its sporting director Albert Nađ to scout Jovović. On January 26, 2015, it was announced that several Premier League teams were interested in signing Jovović, especially Aston Villa. In March 2015, in a 0-3 loss to Budućnost, Jovović and Budućnost player Miloš Novović got in a fight on the field, and Jovović subsequently attacked the referee. Due to the incident, on top of getting a red card, Jovović was suspended by Montenegro's football authority for 6 months.

Red Star Belgrade
Jovović's contract with Sutjeska expired at the end of the 2014-15 season. He trained with Red Star Belgrade in April 2015, although without having signed a binding contract. Jovović started the new season with Red Star Belgrade under coach Miodrag Božović. After his suspension expired, he signed for Red Star on August 14, 2015. He made his debut for the new club in a cup match against Borac Čačak, played on 2 December 2015.

At the end of the 2015-16 winter transfer window, Jovović was loaned to OFK Beograd. The coach at OFK Beograd, Dragan Radojičić, had previously been Jovović's coach at Sutjeska. On February 21, 2016, Jovović scored against Partizan on his debut for OFK Beograd. After he scored 5 goals on 12 matches with OFK Beograd, Jovović was recalled to the first team of Red Star Belgrade, but later he moved on a new six-month loan to Napredak Kruševac. For the second half of the same season, Jovović was loaned to Spartak Subotica.

Returning from loan spell in summer 2017, Jovović started new season with Red Star, being licensed for first qualifying round of the 2017–18 UEFA Europa League. After he failed to make any appearance, Jovović terminated the contract with the club and left as a free agent on the last day of July same year.

Jablonec
Shortly after he left his former club, Jovović signed a one-year contract with the Czech First League team Jablonec on 1 August 2017, with an option for one additional year. He made his debut for new club in 2–2 draw to Dukla Prague on 20 August same year. Jovović scored his first goal for Jablonec on 17 September 2017, in a 5-0 victory against Vysočina Jihlava. He also scored a brace in a 3–1 win over Mladá Boleslav.

Return to Jablonec
After one season Jovović returned to the Czech First League team Jablonec.

International career
Jovović began playing for Montenegro U21 in late 2013 for the 2015 UEFA European Under-21 Football Championship qualification. At 19 years of age, Jovović made his debut for the Montenegro national football team on November 17, 2013, in a friendly match against Luxembourg. He has, as of September 2020, earned a total of 32 caps, scoring no goals.

Career statistics

Club

International

Honours
Sutjeska
Montenegrin First League: 2012–13, 2013–14

References

External links
 
 
 
 
 

1994 births
Living people
Footballers from Nikšić
Association football midfielders
Montenegrin footballers
Montenegro youth international footballers
Montenegro under-21 international footballers
Montenegro international footballers
FK Sutjeska Nikšić players
Red Star Belgrade footballers
OFK Beograd players
FK Napredak Kruševac players
FK Spartak Subotica players
FK Jablonec players
Montenegrin First League players
Serbian SuperLiga players
Czech First League players
Montenegrin expatriate footballers
Expatriate footballers in Serbia
Montenegrin expatriate sportspeople in Serbia
Expatriate footballers in the Czech Republic
Montenegrin expatriate sportspeople in the Czech Republic